The British National Party (BNP) leadership election of 2019 took place in July 2019 to elect the leader of the BNP. Four years had passed since the previous election in 2015, and the party constitution required a leadership election to be held quadrennially. Incumbent BNP leader Adam Walker was first elected in 2015 after previously serving as Acting Leader and Deputy Leader, and he stood for re-election. His sole opponent was BNP press officer, national spokesman, and London mayoral candidate David Furness. He announced his leadership campaign on his YouTube channel and received endorsements from several notable party members.

Walker was re-elected by a margin of 147 votes, and a margin of victory of 30.88%. The runner-up David Furness received 161 votes, or 33.82% of the total vote. There were 7 spoiled ballots (equal to 1.47% of the vote). Turnout was 40% of eligible voters, an increase from 2015, although the total turnout had decreased. The returning officer David O’Loughlin announced the results at an unnamed venue in North West London on Monday 29th July 2019, starting at 2pm and concluding later that day. The results were added onto the BNP website on July 31. Furness' name has since been removed across the BNP website, and he later joined the British Democratic Party.

Candidates 
All candidates were required to produce a 500 word write up and a 5-minute video election address, both to be published on the BNP website. They were also required to attend a series of husting events for voting members in order to appear on the ballot. Two candidates were confirmed:
 Adam Walker, BNP leader since 2015, previously served as Acting Leader and Deputy Leader
 David Furness, BNP press officer, national spokesman, and 2016 London mayoral candidate

Results 
The share of the vote was split 33.82% to Furness and 64.71% to Walker. There were 7 spoiled ballot papers.

References

External links 
 Official BNP website
 Hope not Hate

British National Party leadership
2019
British National Party leadership election